Hussein Madkour (1919 – 30 June 2001) was an Egyptian footballer. He competed in the men's tournament at the 1948 Summer Olympics.

References

External links
 
 

1919 births
2001 deaths
Egyptian footballers
Egypt international footballers
Olympic footballers of Egypt
Footballers at the 1948 Summer Olympics
Footballers from Cairo
Association football forwards
Al Ahly SC players